The 2012–13 Serbian League East season. It began on 19 August 2012 and ended on 9 June 2013.

Clubs 2012–13

League table

Top goalscorers

13
 Stefan Stojanović|
Radnički Svilajnac

11
 Milan Lazarević|
Car Konstantin

o8
 Milan Tasić|
Hajduk Veljko

o8
 Miroslav Petković|
Sloga Despotovac

o7
 Miloš Ilić|
Trgovački Jagodina

o7
 Nikola Pecić|
Trstenik PTT

External links
 http://www.srbijafudbal.net/srpska_istok.htm
 https://web.archive.org/web/20150924015756/http://www.fsris.org.rs/Aktuelnosti/aktuelnosti.html

Serbian League East seasons
3
Serb